Fletcher Pond (also called Fletcher Floodwaters) is a man-made body of water located in Northeastern  Michigan. A dam was built in 1931 that blocked the flow of the Thunder Bay River to provide reserve water for the Alpena Power Company hydroelectric power plant located in the city of Alpena, Michigan.

Fletcher Pond has over 13 islands which provide excellent habitat for the various species of marine birds which use the seclusion as a safe place to make nests and rear young. In addition, several stands have been erected in order to provide an acceptable nesting area for Osprey. This has been very conducive to Osprey frequenting the area as the pond has been said to sustain a very large Osprey population.

It is named for George Fletcher, one of the founders of Alpena.

Fletcher pond is a popular destination for fishermen, bird watchers, nature lovers and hunters.

Notes

External links
Michigan Department of Natural Resource Fletcher Pond

Reservoirs in Michigan
Bodies of water of Alpena County, Michigan
Bodies of water of Montmorency County, Michigan
Buildings and structures in Alpena County, Michigan
Buildings and structures in Montmorency County, Michigan